The 1983 Sun Belt Conference men's basketball tournament was held March 5–7 at the Birmingham–Jefferson Civic Center in Birmingham, Alabama.

UAB topped  in the championship game, 64–47, to win their second overall, as well as second consecutive, Sun Belt men's basketball tournament.

The Blazers, in turn, received an automatic bid for the 1983 NCAA tournament, where they lost to Oklahoma in the First Round. They were joined in the tournament field by VCU, who received an at-large bid.

Format
With the additions of Old Dominion and Western Kentucky prior to the season, the Sun Belt's membership returned to eight teams. As such, it reverted to its old format of placing all eight teams in the initial quarterfinal round, with each team being seeded based on its regular season conference record. All byes were eliminated.

Bracket

References

Sun Belt Conference men's basketball tournament
Tournament
Sun Belt Conference men's basketball tournament
Sun Belt Conference men's basketball tournament